Sudhakar Tukaram Shrangare is an Indian politician and a member of parliament to the 17th Lok Sabha from Latur constituency, Maharashtra. He won the 2019 Indian general election being a Bharatiya Janata Party candidate.

Positions held

Within BJP

Member of Zilla Parishad, Wadwal, Maharashtra (2017–2019)
District planning board member in Zilla Parishad.
Member of Parliament 17th Loksabha, Latur Constituency

References

Living people
India MPs 2019–present
Lok Sabha members from Maharashtra
Bharatiya Janata Party politicians from Maharashtra
1962 births